The Ministry for Karamoja Affairs is a cabinet level government ministry of Uganda. The ministry is responsible for the coordination of all government programs in the five districts of the Karamoja sub-region.

John Byabagambi is the minister for Karamoja affairs.

Location
The headquarters of the ministry are located in the Twin Towers, Sir Apollo Kaggwa Road, in the Central Division of Kampala, Uganda's capital and largest city. The coordinates of the ministry headquarters are 0°18'58.0"N, 32°35'11.0"E (Latitude:0.316111; Longitude:32.586389).

Overview
The ministry is part of the office of the prime minister of Uganda.

Administrative structure
The cabinet minister is assisted by State Minister for Karamoja Affairs Moses Kizige. Christine Guwatudde Kintu is the ministry's chief accounting officer.

List of ministers

Minister for Karamoja Affairs
 Mary Goretti Kitutu (8 June 2021 - present)
 John Byabagambi (6 June 2016 - 8 June 2021)

Ministry for Karamoja
Janet Museveni (27 May 2011 - 6 June 2016)

See also
 Parliament of Uganda

References

External links
Website of the Office of the Prime Minister of Uganda

Government ministries of Uganda
Organisations based in Kampala